Sprague Lake is a lake in Washington, straddling the border of Adams and Lincoln counties. It is two miles west of the town of Sprague. Sprague Lake is drained by Cow Creek, a tributary of the Palouse River. The lake was originally called Lake Colville.

Sprague Lake is used for sport fishing of rainbow and cutthroat trout, largemouth bass, bluegill, as well as brown bullhead, channel catfish, black crappie, and yellow perch.

See also 
 List of lakes in Washington

References 

Bodies of water of Adams County, Washington
Bodies of water of Lincoln County, Washington
Lakes of Washington (state)